The 2015 version of the Syrian Cup is the 45th edition to be played. It is the premier knockout tournament for football teams in Syria. Al-Jaish are the defending champions.

The competition has been disrupted because of the ongoing Syrian Civil War, where some games have been awarded as 3:0 victories due to teams not being able to compete.

The winners of the competition enter the 2016 AFC Cup.

First round

Second round

Third round

Quarter finals

Semi finals

Final

References

2015
2015 domestic association football cups
Cup